Brabantse Stedenrij is a term used in Dutch urban planning to designate the polycentric city region in the province of North Brabant, Netherlands. It might loosely be translated into English as "Brabantine City Row" (a term not attested in English outside Wikipedia until LinkedIn adopted it in August 2020). Its population is about 2 million. The main cities are 's-Hertogenbosch, Breda, Eindhoven, Helmond and Tilburg. Other municipalities of the area are Bergen op Zoom, Oss and Roosendaal. The metropolitan region also includes other large towns such as Boxtel, Etten-Leur, Oosterhout, Uden, Veghel, Veldhoven and Waalwijk.

The Brabantse Stedenrij is home to many large companies. In science, technology & engineering one finds Philips, DAF, VDL, Ciber, Atos, NXP, FEI and Thales in Eindhoven, ASML and Navteq in Veldhoven, Vanderlande and Alliance Boots in Veghel, Merck & Co., Aspen and B. Braun Medical in Oss, Fujifilm and Tesla Motors in Tilburg, Bosch Rexroth in Boxtel, and Acer Inc. in 's-Hertogenbosch. Also, the area has a rich agriculture and food industry, e.g. Mars Inc., Agrifirm, Royal Canin and FrieslandCampina's DMV in Veghel, Bavaria in Lieshout, Heineken in 's-Hertogenbosch, Coca-Cola in Dongen, Vion in Boxtel, and Unilever's Unox in Oss.

Municipalities

See also
Metropolitan area
Megalopolis
North Brabant
BrabantStad
Randstad
Eindhoven metropolitan region
Uden Veghel metropolitan region

References

Metropolitan areas of the Netherlands
Regions of the Netherlands
Regions of North Brabant